Schwerin is the capital city of the German state of Mecklenburg-Vorpommern.

Schwerin may also refer to:

Alt Schwerin, a municipality in Mecklenburg
Prince-Bishopric of Schwerin, a former Roman Catholic diocese and a state of the Holy Roman Empire 
Schwerin Castle, located in Schwerin in Mecklenburg
Mecklenburg-Schwerin (disambiguation), various places
Schwerin, Brandenburg, a small town
Schwerin, a former municipality, now a component part of Storkow, Brandenburg
Schwerin an der Warthe, the German name of Skwierzyna, Poland
Schwerin in Posen district, a former district of Prussia, seated in Schwerin upon Warthe
Schwerin region, a former subdivision of East Germany
Schwerin, Kreis Regenwalde, now Zwierzynek, West Pomeranian Voivodeship

People with the surname
Kurt Christoph Graf von Schwerin (1684-1757), Prussian Field Marshal
Lutz Graf Schwerin von Krosigk (1887-1977), Chancellor of Germany
Ulrich Wilhelm Graf Schwerin von Schwanenfeld (1902-1944), German resistance fighter
Gerhard von Schwerin (1899-1980), World War II German General
Fritz Kurt Alexander von Schwerin (1847–1925), botanist whose name is abbreviated as "Schwer."

German-language surnames